Fabrizio Rossi (born 2 March 1975) is an Italian politician who has served as a Deputy since 13 October 2022.

References

1975 births
Politicians from Grosseto
Brothers of Italy politicians
Deputies of Legislature XIX of Italy
Living people